is a Japanese swimmer. She competed in the women's 200 metre butterfly event at the 2017 World Aquatics Championships.

At the 2014 Junior Pan Pacific Swimming Championships in Hawaii, United States, Makino won a silver medal in the 400 metre individual medley with a time of 4:45.23 and a bronze medal in the 4×200 metre freestyle relay, where she split a 2:02.62 to contribute to the final time of 8:09.26.

References

External links
 

1999 births
Living people
Place of birth missing (living people)
Japanese female butterfly swimmers
21st-century Japanese women